Kaitaa (Finnish) or Kaitans (Swedish) is a district of southern Espoo, Finland, located south of the Länsiväylä highway, with a population of 6000.

Kaitaa mostly consists of detached houses, and contains the Hannusjärvi recreational area. There has been a preservation attempt in May 1998 to save the future of the lake.

In the southern part of the district is the Iivisniemi apartment building area.

Espoo plans high buildings along the coast-line.

Notable natives
 Timo Soini, member of the Parliament of Finland, candidate in the 2006 Finnish presidential election
 Jari Sarasvuo, owner of Trainers' House

Schools
There are three schools in the Iivisniemi-Kaitaa area. The Iivisniemi school contains classes 1-6 and the Kaitaa school contains classes 7-9. The Kaitaa gymnasium provides matriculatory tuition. Part of the student places in the Kaitaa school and the Kaitaa gymnasium have been reserved for students emphasising on visual art tuition.

References

External links

 Espoon Hannusjärven Suojelu ry
 Iivisniemi-Kaitaa society
 Kaitaa school and gymnasium

Districts of Espoo